Ferdinand von Rayski (1806–1890) was a German artist noted for portraits and landscapes. He is seen as the forerunner of Impressionism in Germany.

Life

Von Rayski was born on 23 October 1806 in Pegau in Saxony into an aristocratic Rayski von Dubnitz family. He was son of Johann Karl Rayski von Dubnitz (1763-1813) and Sophie Eleonore Henriette Sichart von Sichartshoff (1776-1859).

From 1816 to 1821 he studied drawing under Traugott Faber at the Freimaurerinstitut in Dresden and from 1823 to 1825 studied at Dresden Academy of Fine Arts in Dresden. He began his career as a professional artist in 1829, painting portraits of his noble relatives in Hannover and Silesia. From 1831 to 1834 he lived in Dresden, where he received numerous portrait commissions. He traveled to Paris in 1834–35, and was influenced by the works of Delacroix, Géricault and Gros. Rayski gained a reputation as a distinguished portrait painter, but also produced animal and hunting scenes, as well as, yet less frequently, military, historical and mythological paintings.

He lived in Dresden from 1840 until his death on his 84th birthday in 1890. He is buried with his family in the Trinitatisfriedhof to the north-east of the city centre.

Recognition

Rayskistrasse in Dresden is named after him.

Gallery

References

External links

 Ferdinand von Rayski by Otto Grautoff (1923)

1806 births
1890 deaths
People from Pegau
People from the Kingdom of Saxony
19th-century German painters
19th-century German male artists
German male painters
Kunstakademie Düsseldorf alumni